Johneirio Terrell Bell (born December 15, 1973 in Athens, Georgia) is an American professional basketball player from the University of Georgia. He was drafted by Houston Rockets in the second round (50th pick overall) of the 1996 NBA draft.

External links
TheDraftReview.com
RealGM

1973 births
Living people
American expatriate basketball people in Argentina
American expatriate basketball people in Poland
American expatriate basketball people in Spain
American men's basketball players
Basketball players from Georgia (U.S. state)
Centers (basketball)
Georgia Bulldogs basketball players
Houston Rockets draft picks
Idaho Stampede (CBA) players
Liga ACB players
Obras Sanitarias basketball players
Oklahoma City Cavalry players
Power forwards (basketball)
Rockford Lightning players
Sportspeople from Athens, Georgia
Start Lublin players
Valencia Basket players